Jackson Rohm ( – January 24, 2023) was an American country and pop musician.

Early life
Rohm was born in Jamestown, New York. He graduated from Southwestern High School in West Ellicott, New York, in 1989. He considered attending Cornell University and the University of Virginia before accepting a track scholarship to Miami University. He was a member of the Alpha Delta Phi fraternity as an undergraduate.

Career
Rohm released his first full-length CD, Twisted & Misguided, in 2000.  His second CD, 2001's Sink or Swim, has a modern rock sound.

In 2003, Rohm released Red Light Fever, which included a cover of Concrete Blonde's "Joey".

Rohm released his fourth CD, Four on the Floor, in 2006. The title track was written as a tribute to a fellow musician who was killed in a motor vehicle accident.

In 2008, Rohm released his fifth CD, Long Way From Moving On. This represented a departure from the pop/rock feel of his first four releases and a venture into the country music genre. It was described as "[Rohm's] best work yet," as he "[seems] most comfortable in the country music mode."

Rohm opened for acts including Edwin McCain and Sister Hazel.

In 2010, his Nashville-recorded album Acoustic Sessions was released, containing acoustic renditions of some of his previously released songs as well as five new songs.

Returning to his rock roots with producer Aaron Thompson, Rohm recorded the 12-song compilation Blindsided in Atlanta, Georgia, featuring upbeat tracks "Blue Skies and Butterflies" and "Superglue", as well as the title track, a ballad written for his wife, whom he married that year.

Personal life and death
Rohm lived in San Francisco, California, and Rosemary Beach, Florida.

Rohm died on January 24, 2023, at the age of 51.

References

External Links
 
 

1970s births
Year of birth missing
2023 deaths
American country singer-songwriters
Miami University alumni
People from Jamestown, New York
People from Lakewood, Ohio
Singer-songwriters from New York (state)
Singer-songwriters from Ohio
Country musicians from New York (state)
Country musicians from Ohio
Southwestern Central High School alumni